Yarisleidis Cirilo Duboys (born 10 May 2002) is a Cuban sprint canoeist. 

She qualified at the 2020 Summer Olympics, in the C-1 200 meters, and C-2 500 meters. 

She competed at the 2021 Canoe Sprint World Cup.

References

External links

Cuban female canoeists
Living people
2002 births
Canoeists at the 2020 Summer Olympics
Olympic canoeists of Cuba
Sportspeople from Guantánamo
ICF Canoe Sprint World Championships medalists in Canadian
21st-century Cuban women